Juan Ignacio Fernández Di Alessio (born September 9, 1975 in Buenos Aires, Argentina) is a former Argentine footballer who has played for clubs of Argentina and Paraguay.

Teams
  Asociación Atletica Argentinos Juniors 1995-1996
  Lanús 1996-2002
  Olimpo de Bahía Blanca 2002-2003
  Arsenal de Sarandí 2003-2004
  Instituto de Córdoba 2004
  Cerro Porteño 2005
  Huracán 2006
  Quilmes 2006-2007
  Sportivo Luqueño 2007

References
 

1975 births
Living people
Argentine footballers
Argentine expatriate footballers
Footballers from Buenos Aires
Club Atlético Lanús footballers
Olimpo footballers
Arsenal de Sarandí footballers
Club Atlético Huracán footballers
Quilmes Atlético Club footballers
Instituto footballers
Cerro Porteño players
Sportivo Luqueño players
Argentine Primera División players
Paraguayan Primera División players
Expatriate footballers in Paraguay
Association footballers not categorized by position